Félix Asselin (born November 17, 1994) is a Canadian curler from Montreal. He currently skips his own team out of Montreal, Quebec.

Career
Asselin skipped Quebec at four Canadian Junior Curling Championships during his junior career in 2012, 2013, 2015 and 2016. In 2012, he led his team to a 7–5 seventh-place finish and in 2013 he finished in eighth with a 3–7 record. His best result came in 2015, where he qualified for the championship pool with a 6–0 record. He then went 1–3 in the championship pool, qualifying for the tiebreaker. He defeated Alberta in the tiebreaker before losing to Saskatchewan in the second, ultimately being eliminated. His final appearance in 2016 was a 6–4 fifth-place finish.

Out of juniors, Asselin joined the Mike Fournier rink at third with William Dion at second and Miguel Bernard at lead. On the World Curling Tour, the team won the Capital Curling Fall Open Men, finished runner-up at the Capital Curling Classic and made the semifinals at the Dave Jones Mayflower Cashspiel. At the 2017 WFG Tankard, they lost out in a tiebreaker. Also during the 2016–17 season, Asselin competed at the 2017 Canadian Mixed Doubles Curling Championship with partner Jill Routledge. Representing Quebec, they finished with a 1–6 record. The following season, Team Fournier won the 2018 WFG Tankard. The team qualified for the playoffs as the fourth seed and won three straight games to claim the provincial title. At the 2018 Tim Hortons Brier, they finished 3–5 record, finishing in tenth place. They could not defend their provincial title the following year, losing to Martin Crête in the final of the 2019 WFG Tankard.

Asselin skipped team Quebec at the 2019 Canadian Mixed Curling Championship, with his team consisting of Laurie St-Georges, Émile Asselin and Emily Riley. The team finished on top of the standings after the championship pool with an 8–2 record before losing in the semifinal to Nova Scotia. They bounced back in the bronze medal game, defeating Ontario for the bronze medal.

Asselin qualified for his first Grand Slam of Curling event during the 2019–20 season at the 2019 Tour Challenge Tier 2. His team qualified for the playoffs with a perfect 4–0 record. They then defeated Jamie Murphy in the quarterfinals before losing to eventual winners Korey Dropkin in the semifinal. Also during the 2019–20 season, Team Fournier finished third at the 2020 Quebec Tankard.

Due to the COVID-19 pandemic in Quebec, the 2021 provincial championship was cancelled. Curling Québec then decided to appoint Team Fournier to represent Quebec at the 2021 Tim Hortons Brier in Calgary, Alberta. The event was played in a bio-secure bubble to prevent the spread of the virus. At the Brier, they finished with a 4–4 record, failing to qualify for the championship round. Asselin remained in the bubble to represent Quebec the following week at the 2021 Canadian Mixed Doubles Curling Championship with girlfriend Laurie St-Georges. At the championship, the pair just missed the playoffs, finishing in fifteenth place with a 4–2 record.

In their first event of the 2021–22 season, Team Fournier reached the final of the Capital Curling Fall Open. Because of their previous successes on tour, the team had enough points to qualify for the 2021 Canadian Olympic Curling Pre-Trials. At the Pre-Trials, the team finished the round robin with a 3–3 record, missing the playoff round. Later in the season, they won the Challenge Casino de Charlevoix and reached the final of both the Stu Sells 1824 Halifax Classic and the Finale du Circuit. The Quebec Tankard was once again cancelled due to the pandemic and Team Fournier were named as the provinces representatives for the 2022 Tim Hortons Brier. At the Brier, the team finished once again with a 4–4, placing sixth in their pool. Following the season, skip Mike Fournier moved to Ontario and Asselin took over as skip of the team with brother Émile Asselin coming in to play second.

Asselin, along with his girlfriend Laurie St-Georges, brother Émile and lead Emily Riley, won the 2022 Canadian Mixed Curling Championship for Quebec.

Personal life
Asselin is employed as a geologist at Wesdome Gold Mines. His father Benoit Forget is the coach of his team and his brother Émile Asselin currently plays second on his team. He is in a relationship with fellow curler Laurie St-Georges.

Teams

References

External links

1994 births
Living people
Canadian male curlers
Curlers from Quebec
People from Sainte-Agathe-des-Monts
Sportspeople from Montreal
Sportspeople from Laval, Quebec
Canadian geologists
Canadian mixed curling champions